Omladinski košarkaški klub Novi Pazar, commonly referred to as OKK Novi Pazar or simply Novi Pazar, is a men's professional basketball club based in Novi Pazar, Serbia. They are currently competing in the Basketball League of Serbia.

History 
In the 2017–18 season, Novi Pazar placed second in the Second League of Serbia and got promoted to the Basketball League of Serbia for the 2018–19 season. The club won the 2019 Cup of Serbia.

Players

Current roster

Coaches

  Dragan Kostić (2015, 2016)
  Slađan Ivić (2016–2017)
  Marko Dimitrijević (2017)
  Boško Đokić (2017–2018)
  Oliver Popović (2018–2020)
  Darko Kostić (2020–2022)
  Vasilije Budimić (2022)
  Ivica Vukotić (2022–present)

Trophies and awards

Trophies
League Cup of Serbia (2nd-tier)
Winner (1): 2018–19

See also 
 FK Novi Pazar

References

External links
 Profile at eurobasket.com
 Profile at srbijasport.net
 Page at Facebook

Novi Pazar
Novi Pazar
Basketball teams established in 1969
Novi Pazar